The Minnesota Golden Gophers women's hockey team represented the University of Minnesota in the 2012–13 NCAA Division I women's ice hockey season. The Gophers hosted the 2013 NCAA Frozen Four and repeated as national champions.

Notably, the Gophers were the first ice hockey team in the history of today's NCAA Division I, of either sex, to complete an undefeated season. The last NCAA ice hockey team to complete an unbeaten season was the 1983–84 Bemidji State men's team, which then competed in Division II, a level that no longer holds a championship (the Beavers now compete in Division I hockey). The last team in the top level of NCAA ice hockey with an unbeaten season was the 1969–70 Cornell men's team, competing in the University Division, predecessor to today's Division I.

Offseason

News and notes

Recruiting

Regular season

Standings

Roster

Awards and honors
Hannah Brandt, WCHA Rookie of the Week (Week of October 3, 2012)
Hannah Brandt, WCHA Rookie of the Week (Week of October 25, 2012)
Amanda Kessel, WCHA Player of the Week (Week of October 3, 2012)
Amanda Kessel, Patty Kazmaier Award
Maryanne Menefee, WCHA Rookie of the Week (Week of October 10, 2012)
Noora Raty, WCHA Co-Defensive Player of the Week (Week of October 25, 2012)

Postseason awards

References

Minnesota
Minnesota Golden Gophers women's ice hockey seasons
NCAA women's ice hockey Frozen Four seasons
NCAA women's ice hockey championship seasons
Minn
Minne
Minne